The Lalande Prize (French: Prix Lalande also known as Lalande Medal) was an award for scientific advances in astronomy, given from 1802 until 1970 by the French Academy of Sciences.

The prize was endowed by astronomer Jérôme Lalande in 1801, a few years before his death in 1807, to enable the Academy of Sciences to make an annual award "to the person who makes the most unusual observation or writes the most useful paper to further the progress of Astronomy, in France or elsewhere."

The awarded amount grew in time: in 1918 the amount awarded was 1000 Francs, and by 1950, it was 10,000 francs.

It was combined with the Valz Prize (Prix Valz) in 1970 to create the Lalande-Valz Prize and then with a further 122 foundation prizes in 1997, resulting in the establishment of the Grande Médaille. The Grande Medaille is not limited to the field of astronomy.

Winners

See also
 List of astronomy awards
 List of Nobel laureates—Nobel Prizes

References

Awards of the French Academy of Sciences
Astronomy prizes
1802 establishments in France
Awards established in 1802